Festuca durissima is a species of grass.

Synonyms
 Festuca duriuscula subsp. durissima (Hack.) K.Richt.
 Festuca duriuscula var. durissima (Hack.) A.G. Richt.
 Festuca indigesta subsp. durissima (Hack.) O.Bolòs, Vigo, Masalles & Ninot
 Festuca ovina subsp. durissima (Hack.) O.Bolòs & Vigo
 Festuca ovina f. villiflora Litard.
 Festuca ruscinonensis Rivas Mart. & Fuente
 Festuca yvesii Sennen & Pau

References
 The Plant List entry
 JSTOR entry
 Encyclopedia of Life entry

durissima